Pioneer Red Wings was a women's volleyball team based in Tendo city, Yamagata, Japan. It played in V.Premier League. The club was founded in 1979.
The owner of the team is Tohoku Pioneer

History
The club was founded in 1979 as Tohoku Pioneer volleyball team. They joined the Regional League in 1985 and were promoted to the Inter-Company League in 1997. They were promoted to the V.League in 2000. In 2003/2004 season, they won the first V.league title.

On 6 April 2014 Red Wings were beaten by Denso Airybees in the V.Challenge match, so will demote to V.Challenge league next season.

On 23 May 2014 Tohoku Pioneer announced that Red Wings stop the activity in September 2014.

Honours
Japan Volleyball League/V.League/V.Premier League
Champions (2): 2003-2004 and 2005-2006
Runner-up (1): 2004-2005
Kurowashiki All Japan Volleyball Tournament
Champions (2): 2003 and 2005
Empress's Cup 
Runner-up (1): 2008

League results

Current squad
As of April 2014
 1    Aleksandra Crnčević (fr)
 2    Akiko Kōno 
 3    Chisato Yokota
 5    Akika Hattori
 6    Yōko Hayashi
 8    Kanako Konno 
 9    Satoe Mitsuhashi
 10  Yūko Asazu (Sub captain)
 11  Yukiko Arai
 12  Rika Hattori
 13  Shōko Tamura
 14  Ryōko Atago
 15  Fumika Moriya
 16  Yumiko Mochimaru
 17  Akari Watanabe
 18  Tsubura Satō
 19  Mami Ashino
 20  Mami Yoshida (Captain)
 21  Natsuno Kurami
 22  Yuki Araki
 24  Koyomi Tominaga (Sub captain)

Retired players
  Tayyiba Haneef-Park (2008–09)
  Senna Usic (2007–08)
  Francien Huurman (2003-2006)
  Danielle Scott-Arruda (2001-2003)
  Chaïne Staelens (2010-2013)
  Megumi Kurihara (2004-2011)
  Ikumi Narita (2009-2011)
  Megumi Itabashi (2009-2011)
  Saki Sugimoto (2005-2011)
  Asako Tajimi (2001-2011)
  Miki Sasaki (2001-2011)
  Satsuki Minami (2006-2009)
  Nanae Takizawa(2006-2009)
  Yumi Kohama (2005-2009)
  Mami Hosokawa(2004-2009)
  Yuki Shoji (2000-2009)
  Yukiko Uchida(1999-2007)・(2008-2009)
  Ikumi Nishibori (2007-2008)
  Masayo Eguchi (2005-2008)
  Wakana Uneta (2004-2008)
  Tomoko Yoshihara (2002-2006)
  Mayumi Saito (1999-2004)
  Eiko Koizumi (1999-2002)
  Sanae Tsubakimoto (1999-2002)

References

External links
 Pioneer Redwings(ja)
 TOHOKU Pioneer Corporation(ja)

Women's volleyball teams
Japanese volleyball teams
Volleyball clubs established in 1979
Volleyball clubs disestablished in 2014
Sports teams in Yamagata Prefecture
Tendō, Yamagata
Defunct sports teams in Japan
1979 establishments in Japan
2014 disestablishments in Japan